Rama Vij is an Indian actress who works in Hindi and Punjabi movies and TV serials.

Career
Vij is a well known name in Pollywood (Punjabi Cinema in India) and Bollywood. Her debut movie was Pal Do Pal Ka Saath (1978) with Shekhar Kapur. After that, she acted in various movies; Aarambh, Lava, Hawayein to her credit in Bollywood. She is a well-known face on Doordarshan and has worked in some of the most-appreciated works such as The Far Pavilions (1984), Nukkad (1986), Vikram Aur Betaal (1988), etc. Punjabi cinema, being her specialty, has contributed a lot to her success with movies including Kachehri, Gabbroo Punjab Da, Dhee Rani, Suneha, Veera, Takraar, Chann Pardesi and Khushiaan.

Rama had shot to fame in the region (Punjab) with her roles in Chann Pardesi and Kachehari, both national award-winning feature films in Punjabi. However, she got national level recognition as an actress through the very popular teleserial Nukkad way back in 1985. Despite her acting talent, Rama could not do well in Bollywood, but still she managed to leave her mark in some well-known movies, such as Veerana, Joshiley, Prem Qaidi, Lava, Taxi Taxie (1978), Chand ka Tukdaa (1994).

She has worked in over 25  teleserials including Nukkad, Intezar, Manoranjan, Himalaya Darshan, Rishte, Circus and Zindagi, Misaal, Sabko Khabar Hai Sabko Pata Hai, Sanjha Chulha and Chunni.

Her last appearance in a Bollywood movie was in the feature film Hawayein, directed by Ammtoje Mann. Her last Punjabi movie was Khushiaan (2012).

In January 2021, she was made jury member feature film, Indian Panorama at prestigious 51st International Film Festival of India, Goa 2021.

References

External links

Rama Vij pins hopes on teleserials, The Tribune, Chandigarh, 16 April 2001.

Living people
1951 births
Actresses from New Brunswick
Actresses in Punjabi cinema
Indian film actresses
Indian television actresses
Actresses in Hindi cinema
Punjabi people
20th-century Indian actresses
21st-century Indian actresses